Elin Matilda Elisabet Wägner (16 May 1882 – 7 January 1949) was a Swedish writer, journalist, feminist, teacher, ecologist and pacifist. She was a member of the Swedish Academy from 1944.

Biography 
Elin Wägner was born in Lund, Sweden as the daughter of a school principal, Wägner was only three years old when her mother died. Wägner's books and articles focus on the subjects of women's emancipation, civil rights, votes for women, the peace movement, welfare, and environmental pollution. She is best known for her commitment to the women's suffrage movement in Sweden, National Association for Women's Suffrage, for founding the Swedish organization Rädda Barnen (the Swedish chapter of the International Save the Children Alliance) and for developing the women's citizen school at Fogelstad (where she was also a teacher on civil rights).

Alongside Fredrika Bremer, Wägner is often seen as the most important and influential feminist pioneer in Sweden.

Wägner was the launching editor of the weekly political magazine Tidevarvet and headed the magazine from 1924 to 1927. A prolific writer, Wägner wrote novels, articles in various daily newspapers and screenplays for a number of films. Among Wägner's most popular novels — which continue to be read — are: Norrtullsligan ("Men and Other Misfortunes", 1908), Pennskaftet ("The Penholder", 1910), Åsa-Hanna (1918), Kvarteret Oron ("Stormy Corner", 1919), Silverforsen ("The Silver Rapids", 1924), Vändkorset ("The Turnstile", 1934), Väckarklocka ("Alarm Clock", 1941) and Vinden vände bladen ("The Wind Turned The Pages", 1947). Her three novels Dialogen fortsätter, 1932, Genomskådad, 1937, and Hemlighetsfull, 1938.  are credited with projecting her pacifist stance foreseeing the threat of further war. Her 1941 non-fiction title Väckarklocka (Alarm Clock) foresees environmental issues, but it was her biography of Selma Lagerlöf that is credited with winning her a place at the prestigious Swedish Academy.

Wägner has recently been translated into English with Stockholm Stories (2002), which contains two of her wittiest novels: Men and Other Misfortunes and Stormy Corner. Many of her books have previously  been translated into French, German, Dutch, and Russian.

Wägner was married to John Landquist from 1910 to 1922.

Bibliography
Work by Wägner include the following:

Books 
Från det Jordiska Museet (1907)
Norrtullsligan (1908) - "Men and Other Misfortunes"
Pennskaftet (1910) - "The Penwoman"
Helga Wisbeck (1913)
Mannen och Körsbären (1914) - "The Man and the Cherries"
Camillas Äktenskap (1915) - "Camilla's Marriage"
Släkten Jerneploogs Framgång (1916)
Åsa-Hanna (1918)
Kvarteret Oron (1919) - "Stormy Corner"
Den Befriade Kärleken (1919) - "The Liberated Love"
Den Förödda Vingården (1920)
Nyckelknippan (1921) - "The Bunch of Keys"
Den Namnlösa (1922) - "The Nameless"
Från Seine, Rhen och Ruhr (1923)
Silverforsen (1924) - "The Silver Rapids"
Natten till Söndag (1926)
De Fem Pärlorna (1927)
Den Odödliga Gärningen (1928)
Svalorna Flyga Högt (1929)
Korpungen och Jag (1930)
Gammalrödja (1931)
Dialogen Fortsätter (1932) - "The Dialogue Continues"
Mannen vid min Sida (1933) - "The Man by my Side"
Vändkorset (1934) - "The Turnstile"
Genomskådad (1937) - "Unmasked"
Hemlighetsfull (1938) - "Mysterious"
Tusen År i Småland (1939) - "Thousand Years in Småland"
Fred med Jorden (1940) - "At Peace with Earth"
Väckarklocka (1941) - "Alarm Clock"
Selma Lagerlöf I (1942)
Selma Lagerlöf II (1943)
Hans Larsson (1944)
Vinden Vände Bladen (1947) - "The Wind Turned The Pages"
Spinnerskan (1948)
Fredrika Bremer (1949)

References 

 Stig Hadenius, Torbjörn Nilsson & Gunnar Åselius (1996). Sveriges historia (History of Sweden). Borås: Bonnier Albs. . (In Swedish)

Further reading

External links 

Elin Wägner at HighBeam Encyclopedia
Elin Wägner at IgentaConnect
Elin Wägner, la mujer tras el Premio Nobel a Gabriela Mistral
 Titles by Elin Wägner is freely available at The Swedish Literature Bank (in Swedish)

1882 births
1949 deaths
20th-century Swedish novelists
20th-century Swedish women writers
Feminist writers
People from Lund
Swedish ecologists
Women ecologists
Swedish feminists
Swedish magazine founders
Swedish pacifists
Pacifist feminists
Swedish suffragists
Swedish women environmentalists
Swedish women novelists
Swedish-language writers
Writers from Scania
Members of the Swedish Academy